The 2011 Military World Games, officially known as the 5th CISM Military World Games, was hosted from July 15–24, 2011 in Rio de Janeiro, Brazil.

The 5th Military World Games was the largest military sports event ever held in Brazil, with approximately 4,900 athletes from 108 countries competing in 20 sports. The Games were organized by the Military Sports Commission of Brazil (CDMB) and the military commands (Army, Navy and Air Force), in accordance with CISM regulations and the rules of the International Sports Federations.

Organization

Bidding process
Brazil was chosen to host the 5th Military World Games during a meeting of the International Military Sports Council held in Ouagadougou, Burkina Faso, on May 25, 2007. Brazil won, by means of a ballot, the race against Turkey to host the 2011 games. Representatives from over 75 countries took part in the poll. Rio's existing sports infrastructure, the Brazilian expertise at hosting major events, and the support granted to the project by the local authorities were decisive for the Brazilian victory.

Infrastructure and budget
The athletes participating in the 5th Military World Games were accommodated in three athlete's villages (Green, Blue and White), all located in Rio de Janeiro. The Green Village was located in the neighborhood of Deodoro, the Blue Village in Campo dos Afonsos and the White Village in the district of Campo Grande. The villages were built to be a functional and diverse center, vital to the operations of the Military World Games. The three villages comprise 106 buildings, 1,206 apartments and 4,824 rooms, with capacity to accommodate about 6,000 athletes and 2,000 officials. The budget used for the construction of the three villages is of R$400 million.

Venues

Twenty-seven competition venues were used during the 5th Military World Games, the majority located within Rio de Janeiro.

 26th Parachutist Infantry Battalion – fencing and military pentathlon
 Air Force University – aeronautical pentathlon, football and judo
 CCEFx – football
 CEFAN – naval pentathlon and taekwondo
 CIAGA – football
 CIAMPA – boxing
 Copacabana Beach (Posto 2) – beach volleyball
 Copacabana Beach (Posto 6) – triathlon
 Flamengo Park – marathon
 Gericinó Instruction Center – military pentathlon
 João Havelange Olympic Stadium – athletics and football
 Maracanãzinho Arena – volleyball
 Maria Lenk Aquatic Center – swimming
 Modern Pentathlon National Center – modern pentathlon, military pentathlon
 National Equestrian Center – equestrian
 National Shooting Center – shooting, aeronautical pentathlon, and military pentathlon
 Navy Academy – sailing
 Rio Arena – basketball
 Rio de Janeiro Military School – volleyball
 Santa Cruz Air Force Base – military pentathlon (flying)
 São Januário Stadium – football

The venues located outside the city of Rio de Janeiro were the Resende Airport and the Academia Militar das Agulhas Negras located in Resende, the Avelar Instruction Center located in Paty do Alferes, the Mario Xavier National Forest located in Seropédica, and the Giulite Coutinho Stadium belonging to América Football Club located in Mesquita.

Media coverage
 : Band, BandSports, ESPN Brasil, Esporte Interativo, Rede Globo, SporTV and TV Brasil

Participating nations

Sports
The competition comprised 20 sports, some of them appearing for the first time in military world games, such as beach volleyball.

  Aeronautical pentathlon (details)

 Military pentathlon (details)

 Naval pentathlon (details)
 Orienteering (details)
 Parachuting (details)

Games schedule

Medal table
The nations by number of gold medals are listed below. The host nation, Brazil, is highlighted.

See also
 World Military Cup

References

External links

 Official website of the 5th Military World Games
 Pictures at the Conseil International du Sport Militaire (CISM)

 
Military World Games
Military World Games
Military
Military
International sports competitions in Rio de Janeiro (city)
Military
July 2011 sports events in South America